Thierry Bizot (born 12 May 1962) is a French television producer and Roman Catholic author. He co-produced Fais pas ci, fais pas ça with his wife, Anne Giafferi.

Works
 Ambition & Cie, Paris: Le grand livre du mois, 2002
 Nous n'irons plus chez elle, Paris: éditions du Seuil, 1987
 Catholique anonyme, Paris: éditions du Seuil, 2008
 Tout à coup, le silence, Paris: éditions du Seuil, 2010
 Sauf miracle, bien sûr, Paris: éditions du Seuil, 2013
 Premiers pas d'un apprenti chrétien, Paris: éditions Bayard, 2013
 Par ordre d'apparition, Paris: éditions du Seuil, 2016

References

Living people
1962 births
French television producers
Roman Catholic writers